Tate Lucas Campbell (born 27 June 2002) is an English footballer who plays as a midfielder for  club Birmingham City.

Campbell began his football career with Birmingham City's academy in 2009. He spent time on loan to Alvechurch of the Southern League Premier Division Central in 2018 without playing for their first team, and made his senior debut while on loan to Bromley of the National League in 2021.

Club career

Early life and club career
Campbell was born in Birmingham, and attended Priory School in the Edgbaston district. He joined Birmingham City's academy in 2009, and took up a scholarship with the club in July 2018. According to coach Steve Spooner, the 16-year-old Campbell "can play in defence or midfield. Where he is at the moment he's a better midfield player. Tate's like the lad at Chelsea, the big midfield player John Obi Mikel. He gets it, passes it, breaks play up and protects the ball well. And he is strong in the challenge." Campbell himself "regards his biggest strength as his understanding of the game".

Campbell was one of a number of Birmingham youth players who spent a few weeks on loan at non-league clubs in late 2018, as a section of the development programme designed to "take them out of their comfort zone" and give them experience of the realities of adult football. His spell was with Alvechurch of the Southern League Premier Division Central, but unlike some of his fellows he made no first-team appearances. Birmingham made him an offer of professional terms in April 2020, and in July he signed a one-year contract with an option for a second year.

First-team football
Described in the Birmingham Mail as "a physically powerful defensive central midfielder who can also slot in at centre half", Campbell was selected among the substitutes for Birmingham's first Championship fixture of 2021, away to Blackburn Rovers on 2 January, but remained unused.

Campbell joined National League club Bromley on 16 April on loan until 31 May. He was an unused substitute in the next day's match, and made his debut on 24 April, as a late substitute in a 2–1 win away to FC Halifax Town that took Bromley into the play-off places. According to the club website, "Fantastic work from Ben Williamson saw him find debutant Tate Campbell in space, and the on-loan Birmingham City man took the ball to the byeline, before pulling it back across for Alabi, who took a touch and fired beyond Johnson." On his third appearance, again off the bench, his diving header gave Bromley an equaliser away to Notts County, and he played once more as Bromley finished seventh and qualified for the play-offs. The loan was extended to cover their play-off campaign, which lasted only one match. He came on as a second-half substitute with his side already losing 3–1 to Hartlepool United in the elimination round; the match ended 3–2, and Hartlepool went on to win the final and gain promotion to the Football League.

During his loan spell, Birmingham confirmed that they were taking up the option on his contract. Bromley wanted to take him for a second loan, but Birmingham manager Lee Bowyer was not prepared to let him go. He played in first-team friendlies ahead of the 2021–22 season, and was named on the bench for the EFL Cup first-round match at home to Colchester United of League Two. He replaced injured centre-back Nico Gordon after 73 minutes to make his senior debut as Birmingham won 1–0. A back fracture interrupted his progress, and his next appearance came in January 2022 in the FA Cup. He was a regular in the Championship matchday squad during January and February, but remained unused. With his contract due to expire at the end of the season, the club offered him a 12-month deal with the option of another year, which he signed.

Career statistics

References

2002 births
Living people
Footballers from Birmingham, West Midlands
English footballers
Association football midfielders
Birmingham City F.C. players
Alvechurch F.C. players
Bromley F.C. players
National League (English football) players
English Football League players
Black British sportspeople